Dieyson Anjos da Silva (born 30 June 1993), simply known as Dieyson, is a Brazilian footballer who plays for Resende as a left back.

Club career
Born in Itacurubi, Rio Grande do Sul, Dieyson finished his formation with Vasco. After making his debut against Olaria on 3 March 2012, he was promoted to the main squad on the following day.

On 20 May 2012 Dieyson made his Série A debut, starting in a 2–1 home win against Grêmio. After being rarely used by the club, he was loaned to Caxias on 13 January 2014.

On 17 July 2014 Dieyson returned to Vasco, but was subsequently released. Ahead of the 2015 campaign he joined Icasa, and after being regularly used in the year's Campeonato Cearense, moved to Portuguesa.

References

External links

1993 births
Living people
Sportspeople from Rio Grande do Sul
Brazilian footballers
Association football defenders
Campeonato Brasileiro Série A players
CR Vasco da Gama players
Sociedade Esportiva e Recreativa Caxias do Sul players
Associação Desportiva Recreativa e Cultural Icasa players
Associação Portuguesa de Desportos players
Resende Futebol Clube players